The Tennessee Valley Railroad Museum  is a railroad museum and heritage railroad in Chattanooga, Tennessee.

The Tennessee Valley Railroad Museum was founded as a chapter of the National Railway Historical Society in 1960 by Paul H. Merriman and Robert M. Soule, Jr., along with a group of local railway preservationists. They wanted to save steam locomotives and railway equipment for future historical display and use. Today the museum offers various tourist excursions from stations in Chattanooga and Etowah, Tennessee.

History
Founded in 1960 and incorporated in 1961, the Tennessee Valley Railroad Museum originally stored equipment at the Western Union pole yard, which was located adjacent to the Southern Railway classification yard on Holtzclaw Avenue in East Chattanooga. After the termination of passenger service to the Southern Railway's Terminal Station in 1971, additional cars and locomotives were stored at this facility in downtown Chattanooga. 

In 1969, the TVRM received a land donation from the Southern Railway, consisting of a property located in East Chattanooga on North Chamberlain Avenue.

In 1970, the museum opened a new permanent facility to the public in East Chattanooga. At the time, it had no structures on site. Volunteers had constructed a railyard for the storage and repair of equipment and had rebuilt the abandoned rail line through the Whiteside Tunnel. The reconstructed line ended at Tunnel Boulevard, as the original bridge over this road had been removed some years earlier.

With the reconstructed rail line, the museum had the ability to produce a small amount of income by operating a heritage railroad. They ran passenger excursion trains through Whiteside Tunnel (commonly referred to as Missionary Ridge Tunnel, because it went through Missionary Ridge).

Additional income was derived from mainline excursions operated biannually via the Southern Railway's Steam Program. The Southern Railway's Steam Program was created by Paul Merriman and TVRM, after Merriman purchased the former Southern Railway 4501 in 1964 from the Kentucky & Tennessee Railway in Stearns, Kentucky for $5,000. By 1966 the 4501 had been restored during a 2-year process, conducted at Lucey Boiler Company in Chattanooga. After many volunteer hours by TVRM members as well as paid Lucey Boiler employee work, the 4501 was operated throughout the Southern Railway System.

After years of hard work and much financial discipline, in 1977 TVRM finally built the long-needed bridge over Tunnel Boulevard. The Southern Railway donated an additional mile and a half (2.4 km) of abandoned rail line. The next major task of the museum was to build the East Chattanooga Depot. This depot is a reconstruction of a typical small town depot of the 1920s. 

The TVRM was named to the National Register of Historic Places on August 6, 1980. That was followed during that decade by expansion of the organization, and acquiring more land donated by Southern Railway. During the 1980s, the TVRM gradually added more track and buildings. The Grand Junction Depot, the TVRM Administration Building, and the National Model Railroad Association were starting to take shape during the decade, as well. At the East Chattanooga facility, a repair shop and a turntable were added to provide facilities for locomotive repair and maintenance. Beginning in the 1990s, TVRM started running trains to the Chattanooga Choo Choo (called the Downtown Arrow, now discontinued) and excursions to Summerville, Georgia on the Chattooga and Chickamauga Railway.

In 2004, TVRM and the Tennessee Overhill Heritage Association partnered in acquiring part of the former L&N Hook and Eye line between Etowah (Gee Creek, Tennessee) and Copperhill. Since then, the new Hiwassee River Rail Adventures have been a popular addition to the railroad. With the success of the Hiwassee trips, TVRM created two distinct operating divisions: the Chattanooga and Hiwassee divisions. Crews and sometimes equipment are often switched between the two.

The museum celebrated 50 years during the Labor Day weekend of 2011. Norfolk Southern Railway also debuted their new steam excursion program during the event until 2015.

Current operations
Today, TVRM continues to run trains. It has also started local freight service. Visitors can take a one-hour  round-trip ride, which is often pulled by a steam locomotive. In addition, most weekends from April until November offer excursion trains, at times pulled by steam locomotives.

In 2004, TVRM began providing half-day excursion trains to the Hiwassee Loop, a corkscrew route around Bald Mountain near Farner, Tennessee. These trips run out of the station in downtown Etowah, Tennessee (about an hour's drive northeast of Chattanooga). Since this is along the CSX mainline, which is heavily used for freight, a bus takes travelers on a short ride south to Hiwassee/Ocoee Scenic River State Park to transfer. The  excursion goes east along the Hiwassee River and through the Hiwassee Gorge to Farner, just short of the North Carolina state line. Full-day trips turn south, stopping at lunchtime in the twin towns of Copperhill, Tennessee and McCaysville, Georgia, and returning in the afternoon. 

This route is that of the former Atlanta, Knoxville and Northern Railway and is also called the Hiwassee Route. The remainder of the AK&N (later L&N and then CSX) line in Georgia is operated by the Georgia Northeastern Railroad, with subsidiary Blue Ridge Scenic Railway operating another heritage railroad from McCaysville to Blue Ridge, Georgia, and GNRR freight running south of there.

TVRM also handles freight. On TVRM's Chattanooga Division, there is one industry, Allied Metals. TVRM handles switching operations, under the wholly owned subsidiary Tyner Terminal Railway Company, at Enterprise South Industrial Park (ESIP), location of the Volkswagen Chattanooga Assembly Plant. Even though there are no major industries along the Hiwassee Division, TVRM has the capability to store several hundred cars at the Copperhill yard for other railroads.

Restoration work
TVRM has a working locomotive and car repair shop complex, Soule Shops, named after co-founder, Robert M. Soule, Jr. In March 2011, TVRM completed restoring Southern Railway Ks-1 class 2-8-0 630 to operational status. In September 2014, TVRM completed the second restoration of Southern Railway Ms class 2-8-2 4501 for another excursion career with Norfolk Southern's 21st Century Steam Excursion Program. At present, 3 passenger cars are undergoing restoration. One is No. 1877, a former Chessie / Chesapeake and Ohio, later Denver & Rio Grande Western round end dome-lounge-observation, being restored from long static condition. Another is 1917 Pullman built office car No 98. The 98 was built for Baltimore & Ohio President Daniel Willard and after leaving B&O ownership in the 1960s came to TVRM in 1977, having been a fixture ever since, hence the need for a thorough restoration after decades of service. Next is Southern Railway 832, a 52-seat passenger coach built in 1949 by the Budd Company. Along with the 3 passenger cars, 1953 built EMD E8, Southern Railway 6914, is undergoing restoration as well. Other projects move in and out of the shop as needed as well as routine inspections on the museum's steam locomotives. 630's 10-year-long restoration was the most extensive restoration ever performed at TVRM, as well as one of the most extensive steam locomotive repairs in the United States since the end of steam on the railroads.

Collection

Locomotives

Passenger cars

Former units

TVRM in the movies
TVRM has been a prime movie spot since the early 1970s. Several of the rail cars that TVRM owns have been used in movies, i.e. the collection holds the Pullman sleeping car "Clover Colony" that was used in the Marilyn Monroe movie Some Like it Hot, which was filmed in 1959, two years before TVRM started.

A partial list of movies and music videos shot with TVRM equipment follows:
 Fool's Parade (1971) (Southern 4501 as B&O 4501)
 Eleanor & Franklin (1976), starring Jane Alexander and Edward Herrmann
The Last Days of Frank and Jesse James (1986)
 Fled (1996) (shot on the TVRM mainline)
 Mama Flora's Family (1998)
 October Sky (1999) (Southern 4501 appearing as N&W 4501 with O. Winston Link being the engineer)
 The Adventures of Ociee Nash (2003)
 Warm Springs (2005) (shot in Summerville, Georgia, using TVRM equipment)
 Heaven's Fall (2007)
 Leatherheads (2008), starring George Clooney and Renée Zellweger (TVRM 610 disguised as a Chicago and North Western Railway locomotive)
 Water for Elephants (2011), starring Reese Witherspoon and Robert Pattinson (TVRM 610 disguised as a Southern Pacific locomotive)
 The music video for Josh Turner's 2003 country music hit single "Long Black Train" was shot on TVRM property as well.
 The music video for Eric Church song "Creepin'" (2012) was filmed on TVRM property.
 42 (film) (2013), starring Chadwick Boseman and Harrison Ford Jackie Robinson leaves for the Montreal Royals, a minor league single-A division club under the ownership of the Brooklyn Dodgers, from the Tennessee Valley Railroad Museum's main station. Southern 630 also made an appearance in this movie but with a different number.

See also

List of heritage railroads in the United States

References

External links

Tennessee Valley Railroad Museum
 Additional information about TVRM and co-founder Robert M. Soule
The 21st Century Steam Project by Norfolk Southern and TVRM

Rail transportation on the National Register of Historic Places in Tennessee
Railroad museums in Tennessee
Heritage railroads in Tennessee
Museums in Chattanooga, Tennessee
Transportation in Chattanooga, Tennessee
National Register of Historic Places in Chattanooga, Tennessee
Museums on the National Register of Historic Places